Jean-Yves Prigent (born 1954) is a French slalom canoeist who competed at the international level from 1976 to 1983. He won a three medals at the ICF Canoe Slalom World Championships with a gold (K1 team: 1977) and two bronzes (K1: 1981; K1 team: 1981). His son Yves and his daughter Camille have also competed in canoe slalom.

References

1954 births
Living people
French male canoeists
Medalists at the ICF Canoe Slalom World Championships